Thandie's Diary, is a 2018 Zimbabwean drama film directed by Eddie Ndhlovu and produced by Talent Chitauro. The film stars Tariro Chitapi in the lead role whereas Tinashe Pundo, Arnold Gara, Thabisile Mkandla, Fatima Makunganya and Jane Dembo made supportive roles. The film revolves around the story of Thandie who died accidentally and reveals her real life through a diary.

The film made its premier on 20 August 2021 at the Zambezi Magic. Even though the film was made as a home movie with a low budget, the film received mostly positive reviews from critics and screened world wide. The film was selected for screening at the three-day Nepal Africa Film Festival (NAFF) 2021 on April 23 at National Dance Hall in Kathmandu, Nepal. The film is now available in Digital Entertainment on Demand (DEOD) and most DEOD platforms including Botswana, Namibia and South Africa.

Cast
 Tariro Chitapi
 Takura Murapa
 Arnold Gara
 Tinashe Pundo
 Gift Saidi
 Jane Dembo
 Thabisile Mkandla Khabo
 Zolile Makeleni
 Fatima Makunganya

References 

Zimbabwean drama films
2018 films
2018 drama films